Francis Martin was an athlete and the 1946 winner of the USA Outdoor Track and Field Championships in the men's 5000m.

References

Year of birth missing
Year of death missing
American male long-distance runners